This article provides a list of games that are compatible with the EyeToy camera peripheral on the PlayStation 2, both released and unreleased, organised alphabetically by name.

EyeToy specific games 
These games require the EyeToy to be played.

EyeToy Enhanced Games 
These games may be used with the EyeToy optionally. They have an "EyeToy Enhanced" label on the box.
 AFL Premiership 2005 (Sony. Also see section Cameo.)
 Buzz! The Music Quiz (Sony, late 2005)
 Buzz! The Big Quiz (Sony, March 2006)
 Buzz! The Mega Quiz - Multiplayer mode
 Dance Dance Revolution Extreme (North America) (Konami, 2004) - EyeToy mini games, "hands and feet" mode, and the ability to see yourself dancing.
 DDR Festival Dance Dance Revolution (Konami, 2004) - EyeToy mini games, "hands and feet" mode, and the ability to see yourself dancing.
 Dancing Stage Fusion (Konami, 2004) - EyeToy mini games, "hands and feet" mode, and the ability to see yourself dancing.
 Dance Dance Revolution Extreme 2 (Konami, 2005) - EyeToy mini games, "hands and feet" mode, and the ability to see yourself dancing.
 Dancing Stage Max (Konami, 2005) - EyeToy mini games, "hands and feet" mode, and the ability to see yourself dancing.
 Dance Dance Revolution Strike (Konami, 2006) - EyeToy mini games, "hands and feet" mode, and the ability to see yourself dancing.
 Dance Dance Revolution SuperNova (North America) (Konami, 2006) - EyeToy mini games, "hands and feet" mode, and the ability to see yourself dancing.
 Dance Dance Revolution SuperNova (Konami, 2007) - EyeToy mini games, "hands and feet" mode, and the ability to see yourself dancing.
 Dancing Stage SuperNova (Europe) (Konami, 2007) - EyeToy mini games, "hands and feet" mode, and the ability to see yourself dancing.
 Dance Dance Revolution SuperNova 2 (North America) (Konami, 2007) - EyeToy mini games, "hands and feet" mode, and the ability to see yourself dancing.
 Dance Dance Revolution SuperNova 2 (Konami, 2008) - EyeToy mini games, "hands and feet" mode, and the ability to see yourself dancing.
 Dance Factory - players can optionally see themselves dancing, additional mode with 2 camera targets.
 DT Racer (XS Games, 2005) - photo taken by EyeToy can be used as a custom avatar
 Formula One 05 (Sony, mid-2004)
 Flow: Urban Dance Uprising
 Go! Puzzle (Sony, June 2007) - For PlayStation 3
 Get On Da Mic (Eidos, 2004) - players can see their performance
 Harry Potter and the Prisoner of Azkaban (Electronic Arts, 2004) - features EyeToy minigames
 Jackie Chan Adventures (Sony, 2004) - features EyeToy minigames
 Lemmings (Team17, 2006) - only 20 levels are EyeToy compatible
LittleBigPlanet (Media Molecule, 2008) - players can take pictures to be used as in-game stickers for placement on walls and other surfaces
 LMA Manager 2005 (Codemasters, 2004) - players can have their pictures on in-game newspapers
 NBA 07
 Racing Battle: C1 Grand Prix (Genki, 2005) - Used to capture textures to be used as car stickers in the bodypaint interface
 SingStar series (Sony, 2004-2009) - singers can optionally see themselves when singing
 The Sims 2 (Electronic Arts, 2005) - The player can take a picture of themselves, which Sims can paint as a piece of artwork
 Stuart Little 3: Big Photo Adventure
 The Polar Express (THQ, 2004) - features some EyeToy minigames
 The Sims 2: Pets
 The Urbz: Sims in the City (EA, 2004) - players can have their faces on in-game billboards
 Tony Hawk's Underground 2
 YetiSports Arctic Adventures (JoWooD Productions, 2005) - Features exclusive EyeToy multi-player games. The packaging claims it only works with the EyeToy but it isn't.
 Who Wants To Be A Millionaire? Party Edition (Eidos Interactive, late 2006) - players can have their 'mugshots' on a winning check (Also supports Buzz! Buzzers)

EyeToy Cameo 
EyeToy: Cameo is a system for allowing players to include their own images as avatars in other games. Games that support the feature include a head scanning program that can be used to generate a 3D model of the player's head. Once stored on a memory card, this file is then available in games that support the Cameo feature. EyeToy: Cameo licenses the head creation technology Digimask.

Supported games 
 AFL Premiership 2005
 AFL Premiership 2006
 AND 1 Streetball
 CMT Presents: Karaoke Revolution Country
 EyeToy: Kinetic
 EyeToy: Play
 EyeToy: Play 2
 EyeToy: Play 3
 Eyetoy: Hero
 Formula One 05
 Gaelic Games: Football
 Gretzky NHL 2005
 Karaoke Revolution Party
 Karaoke Revolution Presents: American Idol
 MLB 2005
 MLB '06: The Show
 MLB '07: The Show
 MLB '08: The Show
 MLB '09: The Show
 The Sims 2
 This Is Football 2005
 Tony Hawk's Underground 2
 Tony Hawk's American Wasteland
 World Tour Soccer 2006

References

External links 
 EyeToy official site

 
EyeToy
EyeToy